

This list of African American Historic Places in South Carolina was originally based on a report by the South Carolina Department of Archives & History through its South Carolina African American Heritage Commission. The first edition was originally based on the work of student interns from South Carolina State University or the 2021 update.

Some of these sites are on the National Register of Historic Places (NR) as independent sites or as a contributing property (CP) of  a historic district. Several of the sites are National Historic Landmarks (NRL). Others have South Carolina historical markers (HM). The citation on historical markers is given in the reference. The location listed is the nearest community to the site. More precise locations are given in the reference.

These listings illustrate some of the history and contributions of African Americans in South Carolina.

Abbeville County
 Abbeville
 President's House of Harbison College (NR)
 McGowan-Barksdale Servant Houses (CP)
 Mulberry A.M.E. Church (HM)
 St. James A.M.E. Church  (CP)
 Second Presbyterian Church (CP)

Aiken County
 Aiken
 Aiken Colored Cemetery (NR)
 Aiken Colored Cemetery/Pine Lawn Memorial Gardens (HM)
 Aiken Graded School (HM)
 Immanuel School (NR)
 Schofield School (HM)
 Bath
Jefferson High School/Rev. Austin Jefferson, Sr. (HM)
 Providence Baptist Church (HM)
 Beech Island
 Silver Bluff Baptist Church (HM)
 Clearwater
 Storm Branch Baptist Church (HM)
 Langley
 Jacksonville School/Jacksonville Lodge (HM)
 North Augusta, South Carolina
 Carrsville (HM)
 The Hamburg Massacre (HM)

Allendale County
 Allendale
 Happy Home Baptist Church (HM)

Anderson County
 Pendleton
 African American School Site (HM)
 Faith Cabin Library at Anderson County Training School (NR)
 “The Hundreds” (HM)

Bamberg County
 Denmark
 Denmark Industrial School HM
 Voorhees College Historic District (NR)
 Voorhees University (HM)

Barnwell County
 Barnewell
Bethlehem Baptist Church (HM/NR)
 Blackville
 Macedonia Baptist Church (HM)

Beaufort County

 Beaufort
 Baptist Church of Beaufort (HM)
 Beaufort National Cemetery (NR)
 Berean Church/J.I. Washington Branch Library (HM)
 Berean Presbyterian Church (CP)
 Detreville House (CP)
 First African Baptist Church (CP)
 Grand Army of the Republic Hall (HM/CP)
 Mather School (HM)
 Robert Smalls House (NR/NRL)
 Sons of Beaufort Lodge No. 36 (CP)
 Tabernacle Baptist Church (CP)
 Tabernacle Baptist Church /Robert Smalls (HM)
 Wesley Methodist Church (HM)
 Bluffton
 Cyrus Garvin House NR
 Cyrus Garvin/Cyrus Garvin House HM
 Michael C. Riley Schools (HM)
 Daufuskie Island
 Daufuskie Island (HM)
 Daufuskie Island Historic District (NR)
 Mary Field School (HM)
 Garden City vicinity
 Combahee River Raid/Freedom Along the Combahee (HM)
 Hilton Head
 Cherry Hill School (NR)
 Fish Hall/Thomas Fenwick Drayton (HM)
 Fort Howell (HM/NR)
 Mitchelville (Fish Haul) Archaeological Site (NR)
 Mitchelville Site (HM)
 Queen Chapel A.M.E. Church (HM)
 St. James Baptist Church (HM)
 Stoney-Baynard Plantation (NR)
 Port Royal
 Camp Saxton (HM)
 Emancipation Day/Camp Saxton Site (HM) 
 St. Helena Island
 Emanuel Alston House (NR)
 Dr. York Bailey House (NR)
 Coffin Point Plantation (NR)
 Eddings Point Community Praise House (NR)
 Frogmore Plantation Complex (NR)
 Great Sea Island Storm (HR)
 The Green (NR)
 Knights of Wise Men Lodge (NR)
 Mary Jenkins Community Praise House (NR)
 The Oaks (NR)
 Penn Center Historic District (NR/NRL)
 Penn School (HM)
 Seaside Plantation (NR)
 Robert Simmons House (NR)
 The Great Sea Island Storm (HM)
 William Simmons House (HM)
 Sheldon
 Sheldon Union Academy/Sheldon School  (HM)

Berkeley County
 Cainhoy
 Cainhoy Historic District (NR)
 Cordesville, South Carolina
 Cordesville Rosenwald School (HM)
 Goose Creek
 Casey (Caice) (HM)
 Howe Hall Plantation (HM)
 Hanahan
 Bowen's Corner (HM)
 Moncks Corner
 Berkeley Training High School (HM)
 Cherry Hill Classroom (HM)
 Cooper River Historic District (NR)
 Dixie Training School/Berkeley Training High School (HM)
 St. Stephen
 St. Stephen's Colored School (HM)

Calhoun County
 Fort Motte
 Fort Motte Rosenwald School Site (HM)
 Lang Syne Cemetery (HM)
 Mount Pleasant Baptist Church (HM)
 Elloree vicinity
 Good Hope Picnic (HM)
 St. Matthews, South Carolina
 Bethel A.M.E. Church and School (HM)
 John Ford High School (HM)
 Mt. Carmel Baptist Church (HM)
 Oakland Cemetery (HM))
 St. John Good Samaritan Lodge Hall and Cemetery (HM)
 St. Matthews C.T.S. Site (HM)
 True Blue Cemetery (HM)
 West End Public Library (HM)

Charleston County

 Adams Run
 King Cemetery (NR)
 Charleston
 Aiken-Rhett House Slave Quarters (CP)
 Ashley River Historic District (NR)
 Avery Institute (CP)
 Burke High School (HM)
 Calvary Episcopal Church (HM)
 Centenary United Methodist Church (CP)
 Central Baptist Church (CP)
 Charleston Cemeteries Historic District (NR)
 Cigar Factory/“We Shall Overcome” (HM)
 Septima Clark Birthplace (HM)
 Constitutional Convention of 1868 (HM')
 John L. Dart Library (HM)
 Denmark Vesey House (NR/NRL)
 Dianna Brown Antique Shop (NR)
 Drayton Hall (NR/NRL)
 Emanuel A.M.E. Church (NR)
 Faber House (Hametic Hotel) (NR)
 First Memorial Day (HM)
 Harleston-Boags Funeral Home (CP)
 Harmon Field/Cannon Street All-Stars (HM)
 Richard Holloway Houses (CP)
 Holy Trinity Reformed Episcopal Church (CP)
 Jackson Street Freedman’s Cottages (CP)
 Kress Building/Civil Rights Sit-Ins (HM)
 Lincoln Theatre/Little Jerusalem (HM)
 Magnolia Place and Gardens (NR)
 Mt. Zion A.M.E. Church (NR)
 Old Bethel United Methodist Church (HM/NR)
 Old Plymouth Congregational Church (CP)
 Mt. Zion A.M.E. Church (CP)
 Old Bethel United Methodist Church (NR)
 Old Marine Hospital/Jenkins Orphanage (NR)
 Saint Mark's Episcopal Church (CP)
 Old Plymouth Congregational Church (CP)
 Old Slave Mart (NR)
 The Parsonage/Miss Izard's School (HM)
 John Schnierle Jr./Alonzo J. Ransier House (CP)
 Plymouth Church/Plymouth Parsonage (HM)
 Saint Mark's Episcopal Church (CP)
 The Seizure of the Planter (HM)
 James Simons Elementary School/Desegregation of Charleston Schools (HM)
 Slave Auctions (HM)
 U.S. Courthouse and Post Office/Briggs v. Elliott (HM)
 Weston-Grimké Homesite (HM)
 Jonathan Jasper Wright Law Office (HM)
 Edisto Island
 Edisto Island Baptist Church  (NR)
 Hutchinson House  (NR)
 Point of Pines Plantation  (NR)
 Seaside School  (NR)
 Folly Beach
 Camp of Wild’s “African Brigade,” 1863-1864 (HM)
 Folly North Site (NR)
 James Island
 McLeod Plantation (NR)
 W. Gresham Meggett High and Elementary School (HM/NR)
 Simeon Pinckney Homestead (HM)
 Seashore Farmers' Lodge No. 767 (NR)
 John's Island
 Moving Star Hall (NR)
 The Progressive Club (NR)
 Lincolnville, South Carolina
 Bible Sojourn Society Cemetery (HM)
 Lincolnville (HM)
 Lincolnville School/Lincolnville Elementary School (HM)
 Maryville
 Maryville (HM)
 McClellanville
 Bethel A.M.E. Church (NR)
 Mount Pleasant
 Boone Hall Plantation (NR)
 Friendship A.M.E. Church (HM)
 Laing School (HM)
 Mount Pleasant Presbyterian Church (HM)
 Sweetgrass Baskets (HM)
 North Charleston
 Inland Rice Fields, ca 1701-1865 (HM)
 Jenkins Orphanage (HM)
 Liberty Hill (HM)
 Union Heights/Howard Heights (HM)
 Rantowles
 Stono River Slave Rebellion Site (NR/NRL)
 Stono Rebellion (1739) (HM)
 Sol Legare Island
 Mosquito Beach (HM)
 Mosquito Beach Historic District (NR)
 Summerville, South Carolina
 Ashley River Historic District (NR)

Cherokee County
 Gaffney
 Dunton Chapel Methodist Church (HM)
 Granard Graded and High School (HM)
 Pacolet vicinity
 Mulberry Chapel Methodist Church (HM/NR)

Chester County
 Chester
 Black Rock Baptist Church/Black Rock School (HM)
 Brainerd Institute (HM)
 Kumler Hall (NR)
 Metropolitan A.M.E. Zion Church (CP)
 Chester, South Carolina|Chester vicinity
 St. Paul Baptist Church at Halsellville/Carter Colored School (HM)

Chesterfield County
 Cheraw
 Chesterfield Colored School (HM)
 Coulter Memorial Academy Site (HM)
 Dizzy Gillespie Birthplace (HM)
 Long High School Site (HM)
 Mount Tabor United Methodist Church (HM/CP)
 Robert Smalls School (HM/NR)
 Pee Dee Union Baptist Church (HM)
 Chesterfield
 Mount Tabor United Methodist Church (CP)

Clarendon County
 Manning
 Ebenezer Baptist Church (HM)
 Manning Training School (HM)
 Pearson Family Homesite/Pearson v. Clarendon Co. (HM)
 Pleasant Grove School (HM)
 Trinity A.M.E. Church (HM)
 St. Paul
 Liberty Hill Church/Pioneers in Desegregation (HM)
 Summerton
 Briggs Family House/Briggs v. Elliott (HM)
 Scott’s Branch School/Briggs v. Elliott (HM)
 St. Mark A.M.E. (HM)
 Summerton High School (NR)
 Mt. Zion A.M.E. Church (HM)
 Taw Caw Church (HM)

Colleton County, South Carolina
 Walterboro
 Church of Attonement (CP)
 Colleton Training School/Gruber Street USO  Training the Tuskegee Airmen HM
 St. James the Greater Catholic Mission (NR)
 St. Peter's A.M.E. Church (HM/CP)
 Training the Tuskegee Airmen (HM)

Darlington County
 Darlington and vicinity
 Darlington Memorial Cemetery (HM/NR)
 Edmund H. Deas House (NR)
 Edmund H. Deas (HM)
 Henry "Dad" Brown (HM)
 Lawrence Reese (1864–1915) (HM)
 Macedonia Church (HM)
 Round O (HM)
 Round O Baptist Church (HM)
 St. James Church (HM)
 South Carolina Western Railway Station (NR)
 St. James Church (HM)
 West Broad Street Historic District (NR)
 Dovesville
 Mt. Zion Baptist Church (HM)
 Hartsville and vicinity
 Butler School (HM)
 Hartsville Colored Cemetery (HM)
 Hartsville Graded School/Mt. Pisgah Nursery School (HM)
 Hough’s Hotel (HM)
 Jerusalem Baptist Church (HM)
 New Hopewell Baptist Church (HM)
 Primus Park (HM)
 Lamar
 John Wesley Methodist Church (HM)
 Society Hill
 Lawrence Faulkner (HM)
 Mt. Rona Missionary Baptist Church (HM)
 Rosenwald Consolidated School/Rosenwald High School (HM)
 St. Joseph’s Catholic Church (HM)
 Zachariah W. Wines (HM)

Dillon County
 Bingham
 Selkirk Farm (NR)
 Latta
 Pine Hill A.M.E. Church/Pine Hill Rosenwald School (HM)

Dorchester County
 Harleyville vicinity
 St. Paul Camp Ground (HM/NR)
 St. George and vicinity
 St. George Rosenwald School (NR)
 Shady Grove Camp Ground (HM)
 Summerville and vicinity
 Alston Graded School/Alston High School (HM)
 Middleton Place (NR/NRL)

Edgefield County
 Edgefield
 ** Macedonia Baptist Church/Edgefield Academy (HM)
 Johnston
 Mt. Pleasant Baptist Church (HM)
 Trenton and vicinity
 Bettis Academy and Junior College (NR)
 Bettis Academy (HM)
 Mt. Canaan Baptist Church (HM)

Fairfield County
 Ridgeway
 Camp Welfare (HM/NR)
 Fairfield Institute (HM)
 St. Paul Baptist Church (HM)

Florence County
 Effingham
 The Assassination of Rep. Alfred Rush (HM)
 Florence and vicinity
 Civil Rights Sit-Ins (HM)
 Ebony Guest House (NR)
 Historic Downtown African American Business District (HM)
 Jamestown Historic District (CP)
 William H. Johnson Birthplace  (HM)
 Roseville Plantation Slave and Freedman's Cemetery (HM)
 Trinity Baptist Church (HM)
 Lake City
 Greater St. James A.M.E. Church (HM)
 The Lynching of Frazier Baker (HM)
 Joshua Braveboy Plantation (HM)
 Wilson School/Wilson High School  (HM)
 Mars Bluff vicinity
 Gregg-Wallace Farm Tenant House (HM/NR)
 Hewn-Timber Cabins (HM)
 Jamestown (HM)
 Mt. Zion Methodist Church (HM)
 Mt. Zion Rosenwald School (HM/NR)
 Salem United Methodist Church (HM)
 Slave Houses, Gregg Plantation (NR)

Georgetown County

 Rural Georgetown County:
 Arundel Plantation Slave House (CP)
 Keithfield Plantation (NR)
 Pee Dee River Rice Planters Historic District (NR)
 Georgetown and vicinity
 Jonathan A. Baxter House (CP)
 Bethel A.M.E. Church (HM/CP)
 Bethesda Baptist Church (HM)
 James A. Bowley House (HM/CP)
 Fannie Carolina House (CP)
 Friendfield Plantation (NR)
 Friendly Aid Society/Rosemont School (HM)
 Hobcaw Barony (NR)
 Howard School (HM)
 Mansfield Plantation Slave Street (NR)
 Mt. Olive Baptist Church (HM)
 Joseph H. Rainey House (HM/NR/NHL)
 Hobcaw Barony (NR)
 Murrells Inlet vicinity
 Richmond Hill Plantation Archeological Sites (NR)
 Pawley's Island
 Cedar Grove Plantation Chapel (NR)
 St. John A.M.E. Church (HM)
 Sandy Island
 Sandy Island School (NR)

Greenville County
 Belton vicinity
 Holly Springs School (NR)
 Fountain Inn
 Bryson High School (HM)
 Fountain Inn Principal’s House and Teacherage (NR)
 Fountain Inn Rosenwald School (HM)
 Greenville
 Allen Temple A.M.E. Church (NR)
 Brutontown (HM)
 Claussen Bakery (HM)
 John Wesley Methodist Episcopal Church (NR)
 Greenville County Courthouse/Willie Earle Lynching Trial (HM)
 Matoon Presbyterian Church (CP)
 Little Texas (HM)
 Matoon Presbyterian Church (CP)
 Richland Cemetery (NR)
 Sterling High School (HM)
 Working Benevolent Society Hospital (HM)
 Working Benevolent Temple and Professional Building (NR)
 Sterling High School (HM)
 Simpsonville
 Cedar Grove Baptist Church /Simpsonville Rosenwald (HM)
 Old Pilgrim Baptist Church/Old Pilgrim Rosenwald School (HM)
 Old Pilgrim Baptist Church Cemetery and Kilgore Family Cemetery (NR)

Greenwood County
 Greenwood
 Benjamin E. Mays Birthplace (HM)
 Mt. Pisgah A.M.E. Church (NR)
 Hodges
 Good Hope Baptist Church (HM)
 Kirksey
 Trapp and Chandler Pottery Site (NR)
 Mays Crossroads
 Dr. Benjamin E. Mays (HM)
 Ninety Six vicinity
 Ninety Six Colored School (HM)

Hampton County
 Hampton
 Cherry Grove Christian Church (HM)
 Hampton Colored School (HM/NR)
 Huspah Baptist Church and School (HM)
 Gifford
 Gifford Rosenwald School (HM)
 Varnville vicinity
 Steele Missionary School/Zion Fair Colored School (HM)
 Yemassee
 Yemassee Rosenwald School/Fennell Elementary School (HM)

Horry County
 Atlantic Beach
 Atlantic Beach (HM)
 Aynor
 Levister Elementary School (HM)
 Burgess
 St. James Rosenwald School (HM)
 Conway
 True Vine Missionary Baptist Church (HM)
 Whittemore School/Whittemore High School (HM)
 Little River
 Chestnut Consolidated School/Chestnut Consolidated High School (HM)
 Loris
 Loris Training School (HM)
 Myrtle Beach
 Charlie’s Place (HM)
 Myrtle Beach Colored School (HM)
 Surfside Beach
 Ark Cemetery (HM)

Jasper County
 Ridgeland
 Clementa Carlos Pinckney (HM)
 Honey Hill/Boyd's Neck Battlefield (NR)
 Tillman
 St. Matthew Baptist Church (HM)

Kershaw County
 Camden
 Monroe Boykin Park (HM)
 Bonds Conway House (CP)
 E.H. Dibble Store/Eugene H. Dibble (HM)
 Thomas English House (NR)
 Mather Academy (HM)
 Red Hill School (HM)
 Lugoff
 Ephesus United Methodist Church (HM)

Lancaster County
 Cauthen Crossroads
 Mt. Carmel A.M.E. Zion Church and Campground (NR)
 Mt. Carmel Campground (HM)
 Kershaw
 Clinton AME Zion Church (NR)
 Unity Baptist Church (NR)
 Lancaster
 Clinton Memorial Cemetery/Isom C. Clinton (HM)
 Lancaster Normal and Industrial Institute (HM)

Laurens County
 Gray Court
 Laurens County Training School (HM)
 Mt. Carmel A.M.E. Church (HM)
 Laurens
 Bell Street School/Martha Dendy School ('''HM)
 Bethel A.M.E. Church (NR)
 Friendship A.M.E. Church & Cemetery/Bell Street Schools (HM)
 Bethel A.M.E. Church (CP)
 Charles H. Duckett House (NR)
 Rich Hill (HM)
 Saint Paul First Baptist Church (CP)

Lee County
 Bishopville
 Dennis High School (HM/NR)
 Elliot
 Mount Pleasant High School (HM)

Lexington County
 Batesburg-Leesville
 Blinding of Isaac Woodard (HM)
 Cayce
 Congaree Creek Earthworks (HM)
 West Columbia
 Lakeview School (HM)
 Saluda Factory Historic District (NR)
 Saluda Factory (HM)

Marion County
 Ariel Crossroads
 St. James A.M.E. Church (HM)
 Centenary
 Centenary Rosenwald School/Terrell’s Bay High School (HM)
 Marion
 Taylor's Barber Shop (CP)
 Mullins
 Mt. Olive Baptist Church (HM/CP)
 Palmetto High School (HM)

Marlboro County
 Adamsville Crossroads
 Adamsville School (HM)
 Bennettsville
 St. Michael's Methodist Church (CP)
 “The Gulf” (HM)
 Marlboro Training High School (HM)
 Monroe Crossroads
 Great Pee Dee Presbyterian Church/Pee Dee Missionary Baptist Church HM

Newberry County

 Newberry
 Hannah Rosenwald School (NR)
 Miller Chapel A.M.E. Church (HM)
 Peoples Hospital (HM)
 Prosperity and vicinity
 Howard Junior High School (NR)
 Jacob Bedenbaugh House (NR)
 Pomaria
 Hope Rosenwald School (HM/NR)

Oconee County

 Seneca
 Faith Cabin Library at Seneca Junior College (NR)
 Oconee County Training School (HM)
 Seneca Institute (HM)
 Westminster
 Bethel Colored Methodist/Episcopal Church (HM)
 Retreat Rosenwald School (NR)

Orangeburg County

 Bowman
 Bowman Rosenwald School (HM)
 Elloree, South Carolina and vicinity
 Camp Harry E. Daniels (HM)
 Shiloh A.M.E. Church (HM)
 Holly Hill
 Holly Hill Rosenwald School (HM)
 McCoy Farmstead (NR)
 Norway
 Bushy Pond Baptist Church (HM)
 Neeses vicinity
 Rocky Swamp Rosenwald School (HM)
 Orangeburg
 All Star Bowling Lanes (NR)
 Civil Rights Meetings/Sit-In March (HM)
 Claflin College Historic District (NR)
 Claflin College (HM)
 Dukes Gymnasium (NR)
 East Russell Street Area Historic District (NR)
 Felton Training School & Teacherage (HM)
 Fisher's Rexall Drugs (CP)
 Major John Hammond Fordham House (NR)
 Hodge Hall (NR)
 Kress Building (NR)
 Law Offices of Coblyn and Townsend (CP)
 Lowman Hall (NR)
 Mt. Pisgah Baptist Church (NR)
 Orangeburg City Cemetery (NR)
 Orangeburg Downtown Historic District NR
 The Orangeburg Massacre (HM)
 South Carolina State College Historic District (NR)
 South Carolina State University (HM)
 St. Paul’s Episcopal Church (HM)
 John Benjamin Taylor House (HM)
 Tingley Memorial Hall, Claflin College (NR)
 Treadwell Street Historic District (NR)
 Trinity Methodist Episcopal Church (HM/NR)
 Wilkinson High School (Belleville campus) (HM)
 Wilkinson High School (Goff campus) (HM)
 Williams Chapel A.M.E. Church (HM/NR)
 Orangeburg vicinity
 Great Branch Teacherage (NR)
 Great Branch School and Teacherage (HM)
 Mattie E. Pegues New Homemakers Camp (HM)
 Pewilburwhitcade New Farmers Camp (HM)

Pickens County
 Clemson
 Fort Hill Slave and Convict Cemetery/Woodland Cemetery Clemson University (HM)
 Fort Hill Slave Quarters/Clemson College Convict Stockade (HM)
 Integration with Dignity (HM)
 Liberty
 Liberty Colored High School (NR)

Richland County

 Blythewood
 Bethel Baptist Church (HM)
 Little Zion Baptist Church (HM)
 Columbia
 1900 Block Henderson Street/William J. Sumter (HM)
 Allen University (HM)
 Allen University Historic District (HM/NR)
 Alston House (HM/NR)
 Benedict College (HM)
 Benedict College Historic District  (NR/HM)
 Bethel A.M.E. Church (HM/NR)
 Bible Way Church of Atlas Road (HM)
 Big Apple/House of Peace Synagogue (NR)
 Blossom Street School (HM)
 Booker T. Washington High School Auditorium (NR)
 Booker T. Washington School/Booker T. Washington High (HM)
 Calvary Baptist Church, 1865-1945 (HM)
 Canal Dime Savings Bank/Bouie v. City of Columbia (1964) (HM)
 Carver Theatre (HM/NR)
 Chappelle Administration Building (NR/NHL)
 Champion & Pearson Funeral Home (NR)
 Columbia Civil Rights Sit-Ins/Barr v. City of Columbia (1964) HM
 Columbia Township Auditorium (NR)
Cyril O Spann Medical Office (HM/NR)
 Harriet M. Cornwell Tourist House (HM/NR)
 Howard School Site (HM)
 Edwards v. S.C. (HM)
 Dr. Matilda A. Evans House (HM/HM)
 Fair-Rutherford and Rutherford Houses (NR)
 First Calvary Baptist Church (HM)
 Florence Benson Elementary (NR)
 Fort Jackson Elementary School/Hood Street Elementary School (HM)
 Nathaniel J. Frederick House (HM)
 Good Samaritan-Waverly Hospital (HM/NR)
 Harden Street Substation (NR)
 Heidt-Russell House (HM)
 James M. Hinton House (HM)
 Howard School Site (HM)
 Kress Building (NR)
 Ladson Presbyterian Church (HM/NR)
 Leevy’s Funeral Home (NR)
 Lighthouse & Informer (HM)
 Robert Weston Mance House (HM)
 Manigault’s Funeral Home/Congaree Casket Company (HM)
 Mann-Simons Cottage (HM/NR)
 Minton Family Home/Dr. Henry McKee Minton (HM)
 Modjeska Monteith Simkins House (HM/NR)
 Monteith School (HM)
 North Carolina Mutual Building (HM/NR)
 Matthew J. Perry House (HM)
 I. DeQuincey Newman House (HM)
 Palmetto Education Association (HM)
 Pine Grove Rosenwald School (HM/NR)
 Randolph Cemetery (HM/NR)
 Richard Samuel Roberts House (HM)
 Ruth’s Beauty Parlor (CP)
 Sidney Park C.M.E. Church (HM/NR)
 St. Luke’s Episcopal Church (HM)
 St. Paul Church (HM)
 St. Paul Church/Oak Grove (HM)
 South Carolina Statehouse (NR)
 Victory Savings Bank (HM)
 Visanka-Starks House (HM)
 Waverly Historic District (HM/NR)
 Wesley Methodist Church (HM/CP)
 A.P. Williams Funeral Home (NR)
 Zion Baptist Church (HM)
 Zion Chapel Baptist Church No. 1 (HM)
 Eastover and vicinity
 Goodwill Plantation (NR)
 Hopkins
 New Light Beulah Baptist Church (HM)
 St. Phillip A.M.E. Church (HM)
 St. Phillip School (NR)
 Kensington (HM)
 Siloam School (NR)
 St. Phillip School (NR)
 St. Thomas Protestant Episcopal Church (NR)
 Wesley Methodist Church (HM)
 Gadsden
 Magnolia, Slave House (NR)
 Hopkins
 Barber House (NR)
 Harriet Barber House (HM)

Saluda County
 Ridge Springs
 Ridge Hill High School (NR)
 Ridge Hill School/Faith Cabin Library (HM)
 Saluda
 Faith Cabin Library Site (HM)

Spartanburg County
Pacolet and vicinity
 Marysville School (NR)
 Little Africa (HM)
 Spartanburg
 15th N.Y. Infantry/“Harlem Hell Fighters” (HM)
 Episcopal Church of the Epiphany (HM)
 Mary H. Wright Elementary School (NR)
 Old City Cemetery (HM)

Sumter County
 Mayesville
 Birthplace of Mary McLeod Bethune (HM)
 Goodwill Parochial School (NR)
 Stateburg
 Ellison House (CP)
 Sumter
 Beulah School (HM)
 Kendall Institute (HM)
 Enon Baptist Church (HM)
 Mt. Zion Methodist Church (HM)
 St. Paul African Methodist Episcopal Church (HM)
 Sumter vicinity
 Henry J. Maxwell (HM)

Union County
 Union
 Clinton Chapel AME Zion Church (NR)
 Corinth Baptist Church (NR)
 Sims High School (HM)
 Union Community Hospital (HM/NR)
 Union County Lynchings of 1871 (HM)

Williamsburg County
 Bloomingvale
 Mt. Zion A.M.E. Church (HM)
 Cades
 Cooper’s Academy/Bethesda Methodist Church (HM)
 Greeleyville
 McCollum-Murray House (HM/NR)
 Kingstree and vicinity
 Benevolent Societies Hospital (HM)
 Epps-McGill Farmhouse (NR)
 “Let Us March on Ballot Boxes” (HM)
 Stephen A. Swails House (HM)
 Tomlinson School (HM)
 Salters
 Bethel African Methodist Episcopal Church (HM)
 Spring Gully
 Chubby Checker Home (HM)

York County
 Catawba
 Catawba Rosenwald (NR)
 Liberty Hill School (HM)
 Fort Mill
 George Fish School (HM
 Hickory Grove
 St. James Rosenwald School (HM)
 Newport and vicinity
 William Hill (HM)
 William Hill/Hill’s Ironworks (HM)
 McConnells vicinity
 Brick House / Lynching of Jim Williams (HM)
 Rock Hill and vicinity
 Afro American Insurance Company (HM)
 Afro-American Insurance Company Building (NR)
 Boyd Hill School/West End School (HM)
 Carroll Rosenwald School (NR)
 Clinton Junior College (HM)
 Elias Hill Homeplace/Liberian Migration (HM)
 Emmett Scott Schoo/Friendship Junior College (HM)
 Hermon Presbyterian Church (NR)
 McCrory’s Civil Rights Sit-Ins/“Friendship Nine” (HM)
 Mount Prospect Baptist Church (HM)
 New Mount Olivet A.M.E. Zion Church (HM)
 St. Anne’s Parochial School (HM)
 Sharon
 Blue Branch Church (HM)
 York
 Allison Creek Presbyterian Church/African-American Graveyard (HM)
 Sadler Store (HM/NR)
 Wright Funeral Home (HM)

See also
African Americans in South Carolina

References

External links

African-American history of South Carolina
South Carolina
South Carolina-related lists